Séamus Ryan (1895–1933) was an Irish politician.

Seamus Ryan can also refer to:

Séamus Ryan (hurler), Irish priest, lecturer and hurler
Seamus Ryan (photographer) (born 1964), Irish photographer
Esoteric (rapper) (born 1975), an underground hip-hop artist
Seamus Ryan (character), a Sons of Anarchy character